IHEC may refer to:

Independent High Electoral Commission
International Human Epigenome Consortium